Agaronia testacea, common name the Panama false olive, is a species of sea snail, a marine gastropod mollusk in the family Olividae, the olives.

Description
The length of the shell varies between 25 mm and 66 mm. The shape of the shell is conical and it has a pointed vertex or steeple. The outer surface of the shell is smooth and shiny, and the color of the shell is basically cream or light brown with dark brown / black spots / streaks. The inside color of the shell is white or pale yellow. The body of Agaronia testacea is soft and fleshy, and is protected by the shell. It has a muscular foot that it uses for crawling along the ocean floor, as well as two sensory tentacles and two eyes located at the base of the tentacles. The snail's mouth is located in the center of its foot, and it feeds on algae and other small organisms that it scrapes off rocks and other surfaces using a specialized feeding structure called a radula. Agaronia testacea is found in shallow waters along the western coast of North America, from Alaska to Baja California. It basically lives in rocky intertidal habitats, where it can be found clinging to rocks and other hard surfaces.

Distribution
This species occurs in the Pacific Ocean from the Gulf of California to Peru.

References

External links
 

Olividae
Gastropods described in 1811